The following is a list of episodes for the 1992 animated television show Conan the Adventurer.

Series overview

Episodes

Season 1 (1992)

Season 2 (1993)

External links
 

Lists of American children's animated television series episodes
Lists of Canadian children's animated television series episodes